This article is about the particular significance of the year 1731 to Wales and its people.

Incumbents
Lord Lieutenant of North Wales (Lord Lieutenant of Anglesey, Caernarvonshire, Denbighshire, Flintshire, Merionethshire, Montgomeryshire) – George Cholmondeley, 2nd Earl of Cholmondeley 
Lord Lieutenant of Glamorgan – Charles Powlett, 3rd Duke of Bolton
Lord Lieutenant of Brecknockshire and Lord Lieutenant of Monmouthshire – Sir William Morgan of Tredegar(until 24 April); Thomas Morgan (from 18 June)
Lord Lieutenant of Cardiganshire – John Vaughan, 2nd Viscount Lisburne
Lord Lieutenant of Carmarthenshire – vacant until 1755 
Lord Lieutenant of Pembrokeshire – Sir Arthur Owen, 3rd Baronet
Lord Lieutenant of Radnorshire – James Brydges, 1st Duke of Chandos

Bishop of Bangor – Thomas Sherlock
Bishop of Llandaff – John Harris 
Bishop of St Asaph – Francis Hare (until 25 November)
Bishop of St Davids – Richard SmalbrokeElias Sydall (11 April to 2 November)

Events
April - Trader Robert Jenkins has his ear cut off by Spanish coast guards in Cuba leading to the War of Jenkins' Ear in 1739.
September 22 - Griffith Jones (Llanddowror) writes to the SPCK proposing that a Welsh school be set up at Llanddowror. This marks the beginning of the circulating schools movement.

Arts and literature

New books
Humphrey Lhuyd - Britannicae Descriptionis Commentariolum
Edward Samuel - Athrawiaeth yr Eglwys

Other
23 April - Henry Fielding's latest work, The Welsh Opera, is performed in Haymarket.  It includes personal attacks on Frederick, Prince of Wales.

Births
20 May - Evan Evans (Ieuan Fardd), poet (died 1788)
date unknown 
Siôn Robert Lewis, author and hymn-writer (died 1806)
Aaron Williams, composer (died 1776)

Deaths
January - Thomas Jones of Lincoln's Inn, founder of the Honourable and Loyal Society of Antient Britons
6 April - David Lloyd, Welsh-born American lawyer, 74
24 April - William Morgan of Tredegar (the elder), Lord Lieutenant of Brecknockshire and Monmouthshire, 31
September - Rowland Ellis, Quaker leader, 81 (in America)
4 September - John Roberts, MP for Denbigh, 59?
9 October - William Stanley, Dean of St Asaph, 85

References

1731 by country
1731 in Great Britain